Sandwell Provincial Park is a provincial park in British Columbia, Canada.

Sandwell Provincial Park is a small oceanfront site at Lock Bay, on the northeast shore of Gabriola Island. Hiking, swimming and beach-walking are popular activities here. There are also petroglyphs carved into the sandstone boulders on Lock Bay's foreshore. Facilities are limited to a picnic area and a pit toilet only.

Sandwell Provincial Park is located on Gabriola Island in the Southern Gulf Islands of British Columbia. Access to the park is via North Road, Barrett Road and left onto Strand Road, continuing to the park. Access to Gabriola Island is by a 20-minute ferry trip from Nanaimo on Vancouver Island to Descanso Bay on Gabriola Island.

Other parks on Gabriola Island are the nearby Drumbeg Provincial Park and Gabriola Sands Provincial Park.

Nearby Towns
Gabriola Island
Nanaimo
Yellow Point
Southern Gulf Islands

External links

Regional District of Nanaimo
Provincial parks of British Columbia
Protected areas established in 1988
1988 establishments in British Columbia